Admiral Karpfanger was a German four-masted barque that was a cargo ship and sail training ship. She was built near Bremerhaven in 1908 as l'Avenir, which was the name that she bore until 1937. She spent most of her career with the Association Maritime Belge, SA.

In 1932 Gustaf Erikson bought l'Avenir and added her to his fleet of commercial sailing ships. In 1937 Erikson sold her to Hamburg America Line (HAPAG), who refitted her as a sail training ship and renamed her Admiral Karpfanger.

In 1938 she disappeared on her first voyage with HAPAG, with the loss of all 60 crewmen and cadets aboard.

Building
RC Rickmers, AG of Geestemünde, near Bremerhaven, built l'Avenir in 1908.

l'Avenir

L'Avenir had a long career as a Belgian sail training ship registered in Antwerp. In 1932 Association Maritime Belge sold her to Gustav Erikson, a Finn who re-registered her in Mariehamn. Erikson operated a notable fleet of sailing cargo ships, which in the 1930s dominated the annual Grain race to bring wheat from Australia to Europe.

In 1933–34 the composer Percy Grainger and his second wife, the artist Ella Ström, were passengers on l'Avenir from Europe to Port Germein, South Australia.

Admiral Karpfanger

In 1937 HAPAG bought l'Avenir from Erikson and had her overhauled and refitted as a training ship for its officer cadets. HAPAG renamed the ship Admiral Karpfanger after Berend Jacobsen Karpfanger (1623–83), a 17th-century admiral of the Hanseatic League, and re-registered her in Hamburg.

In September 1937 Admiral Karpfanger sailed from Hamburg with a complement of 27 men and 33 cadets. She docked in Port Germein on 6 January 1938 and spent the next month loading a cargo of 3,447 tons of wheat. Her Master reported that the generator that powered the ship's wireless was faulty.

On 8 February 1938 Admiral Karpfanger left Port Germein for the UK. This showed that her Master had chosen to sail eastward to Europe via Cape Horn. She was then in contact with Norddeich radio station in Germany. The last wireless message Norddeich received from her was on 12 March.

Search and investigation

HAPAG took some months to realise that the barque was missing. On June 24 the authorities of New Zealand were informed. It was feared that the ship might have been stranded on either the Bounty Islands or Antipodes Island, both sub-antarctic islands of New Zealand. Later, an Argentinian motor ship, the  Bahia Blanca, searched for her but found nothing. A HAPAG motor ship also searched the route to search for her, but also found nothing.

A Chilean ship searched the Cape Horn region from 10 to 12 October. In Windhound Bay on the south coast of Navarino Island her crew found two pieces of a door, a piece of name plate and a piece of wooden wreckage with a rope from the Belgian Navy attached to it. These pieces of wreckage were believed to be from Admiral Karpfanger.

One ship in the area at the time that Admiral Karpfanger disappeared reported that it had sighted icebergs from Antarctica unusually far north for the time of year. Early in 1939 a maritime court in Hamburg noted different possible causes for her loss. She could have struck an iceberg. Alternatively a heavy sea could have damaged her rigging, her hatches or her hull. The court found the cause of her loss to be force majeure.

References

Bibliography

External links

1908 ships
Barques
March 1938 events
Maritime incidents in 1938
Missing ships
Ships lost with all hands
Tall ships of Belgium
Tall ships of Finland
Tall ships of Germany